Marcos Joaquim dos Santos, known as Marcos, (born September 14, 1975 in Caruaru) is a Brazilian former footballer who played as a central defender.

Honours
Dutch Super Cup: 1998
Portuguese League: 2000
Bahia State League: 2002, 2003
Nordeste Cup: 2003
Brazilian League (2nd division): 2006
Minas Gerais State League: 2007

Contract
2 January 2008 to 31 December 2009

External links
 Guardian Stats Centre
 sambafoot.com
 atletico.com.br
 zerozero.pt
 placar
 CBF

1975 births
Living people
Brazilian footballers
PSV Eindhoven players
Sporting CP footballers
Esporte Clube Vitória players
C.F. Estrela da Amadora players
CR Vasco da Gama players
Paraná Clube players
Clube Atlético Mineiro players
People from Caruaru
Association football defenders
Sportspeople from Pernambuco